Kunduz airstrike can refer to:

 2009 Kunduz airstrike 
 Kunduz hospital airstrike, in 2015
 Kunduz madrassa attack, in 2018